Soroako Airport is an airport in Soroako, Indonesia. In 2016, the government as decided to lengthen the runway from 1,050m to 1,350m so that the airport can accommodate ATR 72s.

Airlines and destinations
The following destinations are served from Soroako Airport:

References

Airports in South Sulawesi